The Georgian Campaign occurred in 1068 and was led by Alp Arslan of the Seljuk Empire.

Background
In 1064 Alp Arslan invaded Georgia, he captured the region between Tiflis and the Çoruh river as well as Akhalkalaki and Alaverdi.  After his victory Alp Arslan sent Bagrat IV a letter giving him two options, one related to converting to Islam and the other related to an annual payment of jizya. Bagrat declared his submission to paying the annual jizya but in 1065 the Georgians broke this agreement.

Invasion
In 1068 Alp Arslan invaded Georgia and brought area from Tbilisi to Rustavi under his control. He was able to capture Tbilisi after a short battle, Bagrat IV then declared his submission. He also captured Rustavi, he entrusted Tbilisi and Rustavi to the emir of Ganja. A Georgian chronicle stated that Alp Arslan had stayed in Georgia for six weeks leaving everything in fire and blood and that countless Christians were either killed or enslaved.

Aftermath
During the reign of Malik Shah the Georgians took advantage of the fights over the throne, they freed themselves from Seljuk rule and captured Şavşat and its surroundings during 1073-1074.

References

Battles involving the Seljuk Empire
Battles involving the Kingdom of Georgia